A second referendum on the Compact of Free Association was held in Palau on 4 September 1984, after the previous referendum had failed to achieve the 75% in favour necessary. Voters were asked two questions:
Whether they approved of the proposed Compact of Free Association between Palau and the United States
What their preference for a future political status was if the Free Association (question one) was rejected. They were offered the choice of a closer relationship than Trusteeship, or independence.

The first question was approved by 67.1% of voters, making the outcome of the second question  (in which 3,378 blank ballots had been cast, more than either of the choices given) irrelevant. Voter turnout was 71.3%.

Results

Question 1

Question 2

References

Palau
1984 in Palau
Referendums in Palau
Palau